Esens is a municipality in the district of Wittmund, in Lower Saxony, Germany. It is situated near the North Sea coast, approx. 14 km northwest of Wittmund, and 20 km northeast of Aurich.

Esens is also the seat of the Samtgemeinde ("collective municipality") Esens.

Sons and daughters of the city 
 David Fabricius (1564-1617), theologian, major amateur astronomer and cartographer
 Johann Hülsemann (1602-1661), Lutheran theologian
 Philipp Heinrich Erlebach (1657-1714), composer
 Christian Everhard, Prince of East Frisia (1665-1708), Prince of East Friesland from the House of Cirksena
 Enno Rudolph Brenneysen, (1669-1734), jurist and chancellor of East Friesland
 Philipp Ludwig Statius Müller (1725-1776), theologian, zoologist and professor in Erlangen
 Theodore Thomas (conductor) (1835-1905), composer, founder of the Chicago Symphony Orchestra
 Gerhard Tappen (1866-1953), General of the Artillery
 Timo Schultz (born 1977), German footballer

References

External links
 

Towns and villages in East Frisia
Wittmund (district)